Oscar Jay was a French archer.  He competed at the 1908 Summer Olympics in London. Jay entered the Men's Continental Style event in 1908, taking 17th (and last) place with 134 points.

References

Sources
 
 

Year of birth missing
Year of death missing
Archers at the 1908 Summer Olympics
Olympic archers of France
French male archers